Piotr Murdzia (born 20 February 1975, in Gdańsk) is a Polish chess International Master (IM), International Solving Grandmaster, and eight-time world champion in chess problem solving.
 
He was awarded the IM title by FIDE in 1994. He won tournaments in Świdnica (1998) and Legnica (2003) making two grandmaster's norms.

He is known as one of the best  chess problem solvers in the world. He has won the World Chess Solving Championship eight times (2002, 2005, 2006, 2008, 2009, 2012, 2013, 2018) and placed second four times (2001, 2004, 2010, 2014). He also won the gold medal seven times in the team event of the same competition (2009, 2010, 2011, 2012, 2013, 2014, 2015). Murdzia also won eight times the European Chess Solving Championship (2006, 2008, 2009, 2012, 2012, 2013, 2014, 2016) and four times its team competition (2009, 2013, 2014, 2015).

In the solvers' rating list of WFCC of April 2016, he is third with 2717 points.

References

External links

Piotr Murdzia chess games at 365Chess.com

1975 births
Living people
Polish chess players
Chess International Masters
International solving grandmasters
Sportspeople from Gdańsk